Anant Purushottam Marathe (1929–2003) was an Indian actor, famous for playing supporting role in 1944 Marathi movie   Ramshastri, on the life of Ram Shastri and the role of Shivaram Rajguru in Hindi movie Shaheed.

Notes

External links
 

1929 births
2003 deaths
20th-century Indian male actors
Male actors in Marathi cinema
Male actors in Hindi cinema
Place of birth missing